The Hong Kong Economic Times (abbreviated as the HKET) is a financial daily newspaper in Hong Kong. It was founded by Lawrence S P Fung, (chairman), Perry Mak (managing director), Arthur Shek Kang-chuen(executive director) and other founders with a HK$20 million investment in 1988.

The newspaper is published by Hong Kong Economic Times Holdings Limited. It has been listed on the main board of the Stock Exchange of Hong Kong since 3 August 2005.

Magazine tie-ins with HKET
Money Times (weekly:Mondays) – information about stock market trends, wealth management, foreign exchange and funds. Financial experts give tips for investment.
Property Times (weekly:Saturdays) – a property magazine with features and practical tips for transactions, interior design; also cover properties in the mainland. (Also for retail sale)

hket.com
A digital edition of HKET, hket.com, covers the content from the print edition and a news archive since 2005.

HKET ET-Learning Online English Learning System
ET-Learning was launched in 2009 with a newly developed Online English Learning System focusing on New Senior Secondary (NSS) curriculum structure. With over 90 text types, 5,000 vocabulary items etc. to polish listening, reading and writing skills, students can learn and progress at their own pace, while enhancing their English proficiency step by step.
ET-Learning System is mainly targeting secondary 4 & 5 students, while junior secondary vocabulary on tourism is designed for junior students.

Other HKET school publications subscription
 Econ School《校園經濟》(Mondays and Thursdays)
 Liberal Studies《通識教育》(Mondays and Thursdays)
 English Street《英語街》(Mondays and Thursdays)
 School Chinese《校園中文》(Thursdays)
 《發現號》(Wednesdays)
 Together with daily online version of HKET

See also
 Newspapers of Hong Kong
 Media in Hong Kong

Notes

External links
  

Chinese-language newspapers published in Hong Kong
Publications established in 1988
Business newspapers published in Hong Kong